AFI is an album by the American rock band AFI, compiling tracks from their releases on Nitro Records between 1996 and 2001, before the band signed to DreamWorks Records and achieved mainstream success. Released on November 2, 2004, the compilation peaked at #88 on the Billboard 200.

The album's tracks are presented in reverse chronological order from their Nitro Records release dates, beginning with material from The Art of Drowning (2001) and proceeding through the All Hallow's E.P. (1999), Black Sails in the Sunset (1999), Shut Your Mouth and Open Your Eyes (1997), Very Proud of Ya (1996), and Answer That and Stay Fashionable (originally released in 1995 on Wingnut Records, re-released by Nitro in 1997). It includes the Art of Drowning B-side "A Winter's Tale", previously released on The Days of the Phoenix E.P. (2001), as well as three tracks previously exclusive to the LP releases of the band's albums: "Lower It" is from the LP release of Black Sails in the Sunset, while "Rolling Balls" and "Who Said You Could Touch Me?" are from the LP release of Very Proud of Ya.

Background 
The album is the last major Nitro Records release of AFI material recorded before their DreamWorks Records debut, Sing the Sorrow. According to Discogs, the album was "Allegedly released by Nitro Records without AFI's permission". A month before its release, the band posted on their official message board:While we're really proud of our history and accomplishments we feel our career is really just getting started and feel slightly embarrassed by anything that hints at retrospect. There's plenty of time for that later when we're old. We'd rather move forward....

Track listing

Reception 

According to a PunkNews.org review, the album is "Purely intended as a proper introduction to fans first associated with AFI from their 2003 major label debut full-length, Sing the Sorrow" which functions as "a nice sampler of material ... of the band's back catalog."

Chart positions

References 

AFI (band) albums
2004 greatest hits albums
Nitro Records compilation albums